David or Dave Pope may refer to:

 Dave Pope (1921–1999), American baseball player
 David Pope (basketball) (1962–2016), American basketball player
 David Pope (cartoonist) (born 1965), Australian editorial cartoonist

See also
 David Pope Anderson (born 1955), American computer research scientist